The Javelin class is a 17.7-foot dinghy designed by Peter Milne in 1968. It is designed with plenty of sail area and a single trapeze. The boat is raced in the United Kingdom, Germany and the Netherlands.
 

In handicap racing the Javelin sails off a Portsmouth Yardstick of 926.

References

External links
Javelin UK Class
Javelin NL Class
Javelin DE Class

Dinghies
Sailboat type designs by Peter Milne